Innocent Kaia (born 10 August 1992) is a Zimbabwean cricketer. He made his Twenty20 debut for Zimbabwe in the 2017 Africa T20 Cup on 15 September 2017. In December 2020, he was selected to play for the Southern Rocks in the 2020–21 Logan Cup.

Career
He made his Twenty20 International (T20I) debut on 17 September 2021, for Zimbabwe against Scotland. He made his One Day International (ODI) debut on 4 June 2022, for Zimbabwe against Afghanistan. During Zimbabwe's series against Bangladesh, he scored his first century in ODIs.

On 4 February 2023, Kaia made his Test debut against the West Indies.

References

External links
 

1992 births
Living people
Zimbabwean cricketers
Zimbabwe One Day International cricketers
Zimbabwe Twenty20 International cricketers
Mountaineers cricketers
Southern Rocks cricketers
Mid West Rhinos cricketers
Sportspeople from Harare